Escarpia is a genus of polychaetes belonging to the family Siboglinidae.

The species of this genus are found in Northern America, Eastern Asia.

Species:

Escarpia laminata 
Escarpia southwardae 
Escarpia spicata

References

Polychaetes
Polychaete genera